Hajj Esmaeil (also Romanized as Ḩājj Esmāe‘īl; also known as Ḩājjī Esmāe‘īl and Kalāteh-ye Ḩājjī Esmā‘īl) is a village in Bizaki Rural District, Golbajar District, Chenaran County, Razavi Khorasan Province, Iran. At the 2006 census, its population was 52, in 11 families.

References 

Populated places in Chenaran County